Augustus Maria Bernard Anthony John Gebhard Toebbe (January 15, 1829 – May 2, 1884) was a German-born American prelate of the Catholic Church. He was the second Bishop of Covington, serving from 1869 until his death in 1884.

Early life and priesthood
Augustus Toebbe was born at Meppen, in the Kingdom of Hanover, on January 15, 1829. He was the son of Heinrich Toebbe, a prominent innskeeper, and Maria Balte. He entered the gymnasium at Meppen in 1838 and began preparing for a business career. He graduated from the gymnasium in 1847 and followed commercial pursuits until 1852, when he decided to enter the priesthood and work in the American missions.

Upon arriving in the United States, he was received into the Archdiocese of Cincinnati and completed his theological studies at Mount St. Mary's Seminary of the West. He was ordained a priest on September 14, 1854 by Archbishop John Baptist Purcell. His first assignment was to St. Peter's Church in New Richmond, which included mission stations in Columbia and Ripley.

After spending two years at St. Boniface's Church in Cincinnati, he was made assistant pastor (1857) and then pastor (1865) of St. Philomena's Church in Cincinnati. In 1866 he served on the council of theologians for the second Plenary Council of Baltimore.

Bishop of Covington
On September 24, 1869, Toebbe was appointed Bishop of Covington in Kentucky by Pope Pius IX. He received his episcopal consecration on January 9, 1870 from Bishop Sylvester Horton Rosecrans of Columbus, with Bishops John Luers and William George McCloskey serving as co-consecrators, at St. Philomena's Church.

He opened a boys' orphanage in Cold Spring in 1870, erected a hospital in Lexington in 1874, and established a diocesan seminary in 1879. He also introduced the Sisters of Notre Dame and the Sisters of the Good Shepherd into the diocese. In his 14 years as bishop, he oversaw an increase of the diocese's Catholic population to 40,000 people, the number of churches to 52, and the number of priests to 56.

Toebbe died on May 2, 1884 at age 55. He was buried in the crypt of St. Mary Cathedral but his remains were later moved to St. Mary Cemetery in Fort Mitchell.

References

Episcopal succession

1829 births
1884 deaths
German emigrants to the United States
Roman Catholic bishops of Covington
19th-century Roman Catholic bishops in the United States
Roman Catholic Archdiocese of Cincinnati
Catholics from Kentucky
People from Meppen